Gugdar is a remote village in the Bagh District of Kashmir, Pakistan with a population of nearly 2,000. It was nominated as the prettiest town in the Bagh District in both 2009 and 2010. It failed to win the 2009 title, and the 2010 competition is still ongoing.

Location and facilities
It is possible to travel to Gugdar from Bagh or Abbaspur. Both these routes meet at Mahmood Galli. Road is single. It also depends on the weather conditions as travel can be difficult due to heavy snowfall particularly in December and January. There has been some progress in snow removal and road clearance over the last few years, as previously people of tehsil haveli were cut-off from the capital, Muzaffarabad, and nearby Rawalpindi for 8–10 days on some occasions. This area solely depends on these two cities, especially latter, for supply of common goods. From Bagh town it takes up to 2–3 hours. Nearby villages include Nakka, Badhal, Pallangi, Khalsa, Jabbar, Kashmir, Taran, Kashmir and Chaya, Kashmir.

The village has a middle school for boys, a high school for girls, a rural health centre and a bazaar. Health services certainly need improvement, as a doctor is occasionally available in the basic health unit. It is mostly run by a dispenser who treats the patients. Most people have to travel all the way to Forward Kahuta, a nearly 45-minute drive, to receive basic treatment and even much further for complicated treatment and surgery.

Private schools which were running relatively smoothly have been affected by the 2005 Kashmir earthquake and most either closed or are desperately short of skilled teaching staff. Parents have no choice but to send their children to other towns for education.

Different Non-governmental organizations (NGOs) constructed schools in this area.  A Japanese NGO namely JEN built two primary schools in nearby Looyian Kalsan and Jahani Wala in 2006.

Ethnicity and tribes
People living in this area belong to a tribe or caste called Khawaja and are well-respected and educated. Other tribes include Rathore, sheikh and Gujjar. Generally, people from the different castes get on well with each other.

Local Institutions
There is no hotel in the area so the area cannot accommodate overnight visitors, but guest accommodations are available a short drive away in Forward Kahuta. Food and tea is available to eat and take-away during daytime hours and some restaurants are open late, particularly in summer (Hygiene standards may not be very good).

The Jamia Mosque in Gugdar attracts huge crowds on Friday and Eid prayers and offers opportunities for locals to get together and celebrate. The National Bank of Pakistan has a branch in Gugdar.

Historical events
Gugdar Bazaar burned in fire in the late 1980s by, what looked like, accidental fire which started in huge can of kerosene oil. As most of the shops were made of timber it took only a few minutes for fire to destroy whole bazaar.  Indian army missiles struck Gugdar during tensions between India and Pakistan in 2003, as the India-Pakistan border is nearby. Recent years have seen relative calm on both sides of the border as both India and Pakistan being nuclear powers, war does not look like an option.

Weather 
Weather is mild in summer and locals enjoy it. In contrast winter is very cold and harsh. Snow fall can also be seen in months of December and February.  Most houses have no central heating, so nights can be very cold.

Sources 
https://web.archive.org/web/20071021213153/http://aai.org.au/operations/pakistan.html
http://www.erra.gov.pk/Reports/KMC/BaghProfile200907.pdf

2005 Kashmir earthquake
Bagh District